Berat Kısal (born March 21, 1986 in Istanbul) is a Turkish volleyball player. With a height of 192 cm, Kısal played for Fenerbahçe Men's Volleyball beginning in the 2003 season, where he wore the #13. He played 10 times for his national team.

External links
 Player profile at fenerbahce.org

1986 births
Living people
Volleyball players from Istanbul
Turkish men's volleyball players
Fenerbahçe volleyballers
21st-century Turkish people